William R. Leonard (born October 29, 1947) is a Republican U.S. politician who served as a member of the California State Board of Equalization from 2002 until his resignation in March 2010.

Early life
After earning his B.A. in history from the University of California, Irvine, Leonard worked in real estate and property management.

Political career 
Leonard served on the Board of Directors of the San Bernardino Valley Municipal Water District before being elected to the California State Assembly in 1978 on the coattails of Proposition 13.

In 1988, after serving five terms in the Assembly, he was elected to the California State Senate, representing an  district.  During his time in the Senate, Leonard was the longest-serving Republican Caucus Chairman, holding the post from 1990 until term limits forced him to leave the Senate in 1996.

During his time in the Senate, Leonard wrote California's Leonard Law, the only law in the United States to extend First Amendment rights to students at private colleges and universities.

In 1996, by a margin of 63%–37%, voters returned Leonard to the Assembly, where he served as Republican Leader from 1997 to 1998. He was re-elected in 1998 with 72% of the vote and in 2000 with 58% of the vote in a three-way race.

After term limits forced Leonard to leave the Assembly in 2002, he won election to represent the Second District on the five-member State Board of Equalization with 59% of the vote. He was re-elected in 2006 with 55.8% of the vote.

Leonard resigned from the State Board of Equalization in March 2010 in order to join Governor Arnold Schwarzenegger's administration.

References

External links
Campaign Website
Join California Bill Leonard

1947 births
Living people
Republican Party California state senators
Republican Party members of the California State Assembly
People from San Bernardino County, California
21st-century American politicians
20th-century American politicians
University of California, Irvine alumni